The Omloop Eurometropool, also known as Omloop van de Westhoek, was a one-day professional cycling race held in Belgium in 2017. It was part of UCI Europe Tour in category 1.1.

Winners

References

Cycle races in Belgium
UCI Europe Tour races
Recurring sporting events established in 2017